Martin Zurawsky (born 12 August 1990 in Lauchhammer) is a German footballer who currently plays for VfB Krieschow.

Zurawsky made his professional debut during the 2010–11 3. Fußball-Liga season for Jahn Regensburg as a substitute for Mahmut Temür in a 2–1 away win over Carl Zeiss Jena.

References

External links 
 

1990 births
Living people
People from Lauchhammer
People from Bezirk Cottbus
German footballers
Footballers from Brandenburg
Association football midfielders
3. Liga players
SSV Jahn Regensburg players
Berliner FC Dynamo players
FSV Union Fürstenwalde players
FC Viktoria 1889 Berlin players